Diego Amaya Flores (March 27, 1908 in Arriate Málaga, Spain – July 7, 1973 in Morón de la Frontera, Sevilla) was a renowned flamenco guitarist.

Diego del Gastor was the creator and best known exponent of the guitar playing tradition of Morón de la Frontera, Sevilla. Today, this tradition has been inherited by his nephews Diego de Morón, Agustin Ríos Amaya, Paco and Juan del Gastor, several grandnephews and nieces.

Discography

Soloist 
 Misterios de la guitarra flamenca (Ariola 10521-A, 1972)
 Evocaciones (Pasarela, 1990)
 El eco de unos toques (book + CD, El Flamenco Vive, 2007), incl. Misterios de la guitarra flamenca y Evocaciones.
 Flamenco y Universidad Vol. IV (Marita, 2009)

Accompanist
 Los cantes inéditos de Juan Talega (Coliseum, 1991)
 Fernanda y Bernarda de Utrera: cantes inéditos (book + CD, Diputación de Sevilla, 1999)
 Alcalá de Guadaíra en la historia del flamenco (Marita, 2007)

References

External links 
 http://www.gypsyflamenco.com/diego.html
 https://web.archive.org/web/20130530182103/http://www.flamenco-world.com/artists/delgastor/delgastor.htm
 https://www.youtube.com/watch?v=W74IVr_90CQ
 https://www.youtube.com/watch?v=PwSaJnbHe4I

Spanish flamenco guitarists
Spanish male guitarists
Musicians from Andalusia
1908 births
1973 deaths
Spanish guitarists
People from Málaga
20th-century Spanish musicians
Flamenco guitarists
20th-century guitarists
20th-century Spanish male musicians